Inauguration of Lyndon B. Johnson may refer to:

First inauguration of Lyndon B. Johnson, 1963
Second inauguration of Lyndon B. Johnson, 1965